Carlos Wagner is a particle physicist. He specializes in theoretical physics, elementary particles and supersymmetric theories. He currently works for the High Energy Physics (HEP) division of the Argonne National Laboratory and is also a professor at the Physics Department of the University of Chicago, Enrico Fermi Institute, and the Kavli Institute for Cosmological Physics, University of Chicago. He also functions as the Head of the ANL High Energy Physics Theory Group.

In 2008, he was elected a fellow of the American Physical Society, a distinct honor signifying recognition by one's professional peers.  Wagner earned his fellowship for his contributions to the phenomenology of theories of supersymmetry and of electroweak symmetry breaking.

He is married to theoretical physicist Marcela Carena.

References

External links
Carlos Wagner’s webpage at Argonne National Laboratory 

21st-century American physicists
Living people
Theoretical physicists
Year of birth missing (living people)

Argentine physicists